An administrative tribunal is a kind of quasi-judicial body.

Administrative tribunal may also refer to:

Administrative Tribunal of the International Labour Organization
Administrative Appeals Tribunal
United Nations Administrative Tribunal
Victorian Civil and Administrative Tribunal

See also 
Administrative court
Tribunals in the United Kingdom

fr:Tribunal administratif